Major Francis "Frank" Edward Foley CMG (24 November 1884  – 8 May 1958) was a British Secret Intelligence Service officer.  As a passport control officer for the British embassy in Berlin, Foley "bent the rules" and helped thousands of Jewish families escape from Nazi Germany after Kristallnacht and before the outbreak of the Second World War. He is officially recognised as a British Hero of the Holocaust and as a Righteous Among the Nations.

Early life 

Foley was the third son of Isabella and Andrew Wood Foley, a Tiverton-born railway worker, whose family may have originated from Roscommon in Ireland in the early 1800s. After attending local schools in Somerset, Foley won a scholarship to Stonyhurst College, Lancashire, where he was educated by the Jesuits. He then went to a Catholic seminary in France to train as a priest but transferred to the Université de France in Poitiers to study Classics. While there he reconsidered his vocation for the priesthood and decided instead to pursue an academic career. He travelled extensively in Europe, becoming fluent in both French and German.

Foley graduated from the Royal Military College, Sandhurst, and was commissioned as a second lieutenant into the Hertfordshire Regiment on 25 January 1917. He was appointed temporary Captain on 20 September 1917, while commanding an infantry company of the 1st Battalion, Hertfordshire Regiment, and was later with the 2nd/6th Battalion North Staffordshire Regiment, during which time he was mentioned in despatches.

Joining secret service 

The story of Foley's escape from Germany and his language skills had been noted by someone at the War Office. He was encouraged to apply for the Intelligence Corps. On 25 July 1918 Foley was promoted Lieutenant. In July 1918 he became part of a small unit which was responsible for recruiting and running networks of secret agents in France, Belgium and the Netherlands. After the Armistice he served for a short time in the Inter-Allied Military Commission of Control in Cologne. On 19 April 1920 he relinquished the temporary rank of captain, and in December 1921 retired from the Army with the rank of Captain.

After the running down of the commission, he was offered the post of passport control officer in Berlin which was a cover for his main duties as head of the British Secret Intelligence Service (MI6) station. During the 1920s and 30s, Foley was successful in recruiting agents and acquiring key details of German military research and development.

Together with Wilfrid Israel and Hubert Pollack Foley formed a special mechanism that specialized in rescuing Jews who were already taken into the first concentration camps. Pollack had contacts in the Gestapo; Wilfrid had money and direct links with sponsors abroad; Foley was the man in charge of issuing visas. People came to Wilfrid pleading for his help in releasing their relations from the camps; Wilfrid gave the necessary funds to Pollack; Pollack obtained the documents; and Foley granted visas to those who Wilfrid and Pollack told him were honest people whose name had been blackened by the Gestapo. Pollack and Wilfrid kept Foley informed of any agents planted by the Gestapo in the lines of applicants for visas. This story is reflected among others in the film The Essential Link: The Story of Wilfrid Israel by filmmaker Yonatan Nir.

Foley is primarily remembered as a "British Schindler". In his role as passport control officer, he helped thousands of Jews escape from Nazi Germany. At the 1961 trial of former ranking Nazi Adolf Eichmann, he was described as a "Scarlet Pimpernel" for the way he risked his own life to save Jews threatened with death by the Nazis. Despite having no diplomatic immunity and being liable to arrest at any time, Foley would bend the rules when stamping passports and issuing visas, to allow Jews to escape "legally" to Britain or Palestine, which was then controlled by the British. Sometimes he went further, going into internment camps to get Jews out, hiding them in his home, and helping them get forged passports. One Jewish aid worker estimated that he saved "tens of thousands" of people from the Holocaust.

Second World War 
In 1939 and 1940, Foley was a passport control officer in Norway until the Germans invaded, when he was attached to Otto Ruge, C-in-C Norwegian Forces in the Field, for which services he received the Norwegian Knight's Cross of the Order of St. Olaf. Foley and Margaret Reid, his assistant, abandoned Oslo on 9 April 1940 during the German advance, and travelled to Lillehammer and Åndalsnes. Before leaving Oslo, Foley and Reid burned the documents in the UK legation. Foley helped Norway's commander in chief, General Otto Ruge, contact Britain to request assistance against the invader. Foley had his own radio transmitter that allowed Ruge to communicate with London independently of Norwegian landlines. Reid was a cipher expert who coded messages sent to Britain. Until minister Cecil Dormer arrived on 16 April, Foley acted as a UK representative with Norwegian authorities. Foley and Reid were evacuated from Molde by the British navy on 1 May. At Åndalsnes Foley presumably met Martin Linge, who acted as liaison officer.

On 1 January 1941, he was awarded Companion of the Order of St. Michael and St. George (CMG) as a Captain in respect of his services to the Foreign Office. In 1941, he was given the task of questioning Hitler's Deputy Rudolf Hess after Hess's flight to Scotland. After Hess was hospitalized in 1942, Foley helped coordinate MI5 and MI6 in running a network of double agents, the Double Cross System.

Later life 
Foley returned to Berlin very soon after the war under the cover of Assistant Inspector General of the Public Safety Branch of the Control Commission in Germany, where he was involved in hunting for ex-SS war criminals.

In 1949, Foley retired to Stourbridge, West Midlands and died there in 1958. He is buried in Stourbridge Cemetery.
On 27 April 1961, the Daily Mail carried the story, written by his widow, of his activities to save as many Jews as he possibly could with visas to the United Kingdom. When no excuse could be found for a visa to Britain, he contacted friends working in the embassies of other nations for their assistance in granting visas to their countries.

His widow, Katharine Eva Foley, died on 17 April 1979 at her home in Sidmouth, Devon.

Honours and awards 
 Mentioned in despatches for service in World War I
 Order of St. Olaf Knight's Cross (Norwegian) in 1941
 Companion of the Order of St. Michael and St. George on 1 January 1941
 Righteous Among the Nations, awarded in October 1999 posthumously by Israel
 British Hero of the Holocaust, awarded posthumously in 2010

Posthumous recognition 
Foley was accorded the status of a Righteous Among the Nations by Israel's Yad Vashem as a direct result of testimony from "living witnesses" found by Michael Smith while researching his biography of Foley. Lord Janner, chairman of the Holocaust Educational Trust, was instrumental in persuading Yad Vashem to look at Smith's evidence. Some members of the Yad Vashem committee that determines whether someone should be named as a "righteous gentile" were initially sceptical that an MI6 officer would not have diplomatic immunity but the then Foreign Office historian Gill Bennett produced previously classified documents that demonstrated this to be the case. The cover of Smith's book features the photograph from Foley's first diplomatic passport with the date it was issued clearly shown as 11 August 1939.

In 2004 a remembrance plaque was dedicated to him at the entrance to Stourbridge's Mary Stevens Park. The following year volunteers from Highbridge, Foley's birthplace, raised money to erect their own tribute.
 A statue was commissioned from sculptor Jonathan Sells and unveiled on the anniversary of VE Day, which is also the anniversary of his death. The 'Frank Foley Parkway' between Highbridge and Burnham-on-Sea opened on 7 July 2009.

In 2007, a film about Foley's life was in the planning stages, but the producers were then taking legal action against MI6 to release still-classified documents related to his work.

On 24 November 2004 (the 120th anniversary of his birth) descendants of Foley, relatives of those he saved, representatives of Jewish organisations, British MPs and other well-wishers gathered at the British Embassy in Berlin for the unveiling of a plaque in honour of Foley. At the ceremony Foreign Secretary Jack Straw praised Foley's heroism:

On 31 May 2009, a garden was dedicated in his memory at London's Sternberg Centre, where a plaque was unveiled by Cherie Booth.

In 2010, Foley was named a British Hero of the Holocaust by the British Government.

In 2012 the Foreign Secretary, William Hague, unveiled a plaque to him at the Hoop Lane Jewish Cemetery in Golders Green, London, an initiative led by the Spanish and Portuguese Jews' Congregation and West London Synagogue.

A National Express West Midlands bus is dedicated to him.

On 18 September 2018, Prince William, Duke of Cambridge, unveiled a statue of Major Frank Foley in West Midlands town of Stourbridge in the presence of Foley's great-nephew, Stephen Higgs.

Bibliography

References

Further reading 

 Smith. Michael. Foley: The spy who saved 10,000 Jews. Hodder, 1999. .
 Sales, Dan (5 October 2006). "Spacey or Hopkins for Frank Foley film?", Burnham and Highbridge Weekly News. Retrieved 6 August 2021.
 Smith, Michael (27 December 2004).Mrs Foley's diary solves the mystery of Hess The Daily Telegraph. Retrieved 6 August 2021.
 BBC: Inside Out: Foley The Quiet Briton, 28 February 2005. Retrieved 6 August 2021.

External links 
 Frank Foley – his activity to save Jews' lives during the Holocaust, at Yad Vashem website

1884 births
1958 deaths
British Army personnel of World War I
British expatriates in Norway
British humanitarians
British intelligence operatives
British people of World War II
British Righteous Among the Nations
British Roman Catholics
Catholic Righteous Among the Nations
Companions of the Order of St Michael and St George
Double-Cross System
English Roman Catholics
English people of Irish descent
Graduates of the Royal Military College, Sandhurst
Hertfordshire Regiment officers
North Staffordshire Regiment officers
People educated at Stonyhurst College
People from Highbridge, Somerset
Secret Intelligence Service personnel
Military personnel from Somerset